The 2017 Ykkönen was the 46th season of Ykkönen, the second highest football league in Finland. The season started on 29 April 2016 and ended on 21 October 2016. The winning team qualified directly for promotion to the 2018 Veikkausliiga, while the second had to play a play-off against the eleventh-placed team from Veikkausliiga to decide who would play in that division. The bottom two teams were relegated to Kakkonen.

Overview

A total of ten teams contested in the league, including seven sides from the 2016 season, and FC Honka and Gnistan who were promoted from Kakkonen after winning the promotion play-offs.

PK-35 Vantaa, who were relegated from Veikkausliiga, declared bankruptcy and withdrew their spot from the league. OPS took their spot in the league.

KTP and FC Jazz were relegated from 2016 Ykkönen.

JJK, the champion of 2016 Ykkönen, was promoted to the 2017 Veikkausliiga.

Managerial changes

League table

References

Ykkönen seasons
Fin
Fin
2017 in Finnish football leagues